Petro Pereverza (born 10 July 1994 in Bahate, Izmail Raion, Odesa Oblast, Ukraine) is a professional Ukrainian football striker.

Career
Pereverza is a product of the youth team systems of UFK Kharkiv. He played in the amateur level until February 2014, when he signed a contract with FC Chornomorets. He made his debut for FC Chornomorets in a game against FC Metalurh Donetsk on 25 April 2015 in the Ukrainian Premier League.

References

External links

Profile at FFU Official Site (Ukr)

1994 births
Living people
Ukrainian footballers
FC Chornomorets Odesa players
Ukrainian Premier League players
FC Zhemchuzhyna Odesa players
FC Balkany Zorya players
Association football forwards
Ukrainian First League players
Sportspeople from Odesa Oblast